Evan Jones  is an American actor who has been in films such as 8 Mile, Jarhead, Gangster Squad, The Book of Eli, Glory Road, and A Million Ways to Die in the West. Jones was a cast member of the television series October Road and has made guest appearances in series including Brothers & Sisters, and Going to California.

Life and career 
Jones made his debut acting on the TV movie On the Line, which premiered in 1998. This was followed by minor roles in several TV series, such as those in Pacific Blue, Felicity, and Walker, Texas Ranger. He voiced several characters on the animated series Dragon Ball Z, before he landed guest spots on The District and ER. He later got a recurring role in Going to California, and soon appeared on the series The Guardian.

In 2002, he was cast in the horror film Wishcraft, which was followed by one of his major roles in the business. Jones got the part of Cheddar Bob in Eminem’s movie 8 Mile. Jones was later seen on an episode of Joan of Arcadia, as well as in the TV movie The Book of Ruth. In 2004, he worked on the films Mr. 3000, starring Bernie Mac, and on The Last Shot starring Alec Baldwin, Matthew Broderick, Tony Shalhoub and Calista Flockhart.

In 2005, Jones became even more known for portraying Pfc. Dave Fowler in the movie Jarhead, which features Jake Gyllenhaal and Jamie Foxx. His next project became taking on the role of basketball coach Moe Iba on the film Glory Road. From 2007 to 2008, Jones joined the cast of the ABC drama series October Road, getting the role of Ikey.

Other films that the actor has appeared in include the war drama Rescue Dawn, as well as the romance film Lucky You. In 2007, Jones worked on the family film Gordon Glass, and was seen on the drama Touching Home the next year.

Filmography

Film

Television

References

External links 

Living people
21st-century American male actors
Male actors from Texas
20th-century American male actors
American male film actors
American male television actors
American male voice actors
Year of birth missing (living people)